Lee Jong-min (born October 1988), better known by his stage name Babylon, is a South Korean singer-songwriter, rapper, and dancer. He debuted as an idol in the five-member group N-Train under Media Line Entertainment, where he served as a vocalist from 2011 to its dissolution in 2013. He debuted as a soloist in 2015 with "Pray" and released his debut studio album Caelo in 2018.

Life and career

1988–2013: Early life and career beginnings
Babylon was born Lee Jong-min in October 1988. After sustaining multiple injuries as a rugby footballer in high school and casting doubt over his career in the sport, he joined a black music club and was influenced to pursue a career as an R&B singer. A singer, rapper, and dancer, Babylon trained with Media Line Entertainment for three years prior to starting his career as an idol. Under the stage name Soul J, he debuted as a member of N-Train with "One Last Cry" on May 25, 2011. The group issued three commercially unsuccessful releases, leading to its disbandment two years later.

2014–present: As a soloist
After completing mandatory military service, Babylon became an independent musician. Inspired by the name of a bar in the film Scarface (1983), he adopted his moniker "Babylon" in July 2014. He began posting mixtapes onto hip-hop websites that year, which led to rappers contacting him to collaborate. He was featured on a string of singles, including Paloalto's "Good Times" and "Cheers" alongside Gaeko, Yankie, and Beenzino. Babylon released his debut solo single "Pray" in June 2015. After being contacted by Zico to collaborate, the pair released "Boys and Girls" in November. The single topped South Korea's national Gaon Digital Chart and sold over 2.5 million downloads domestically. The single's success earned Babylon the nicknames "Zico's Man" and the "R&B Rising Trend", and the singer was heralded as a leading figure in R&B along with Zion.T, Crush, and Dean. It also established the pair's respective signature sounds.

Babylon signed with KQ Produce, a sub-label of KQ Entertainment, in 2016. He released the song "Real Talk" on SoundCloud in precedence to the release of his first single album. On April 28, Between Us and its lead single "U & Me" featuring rapper Dok2 were released. Babylon released his second single album Fantasy and accompanying singles "Crush on You" featuring hip hop musician Lil Boi and "Today I Think of You" with singer Kim Na-young on June 23. Babylon released a collaboration with rapper Yezi entitled "Chase" three months later. He released his debut studio album Caelo on October 3, 2018.

Musical style
Musically, Babylon is a R&B singer-songwriter. Noted for having a "honey voice", he has been widely acclaimed in the hip hop community. Babylon has cited Michael Jackson, Chris Brown, You Hee-yeol, and Kim Sung-jae as his role models. He identifies Brown, Musiq Soulchild, BJ the Chicago Kid, and Kehlani as the influences over his music.

Discography

Studio albums

Singles

As lead artist

As featured artist

Guest appearances

Soundtrack appearances

Filmography

Notes

References

External links
 

1988 births
21st-century South Korean  male singers
K-pop singers
KQ Entertainment artists
Living people
N-Train members
South Korean contemporary R&B singers
South Korean male dancers
South Korean male idols
South Korean male singer-songwriters